U.S. Route 301 (US 301) is a  U.S. Highway that travels north–south from the Savannah River southwest of Allendale to Hamer approaching the South of the Border roadside attraction complex.

Route description
US 301 enters South Carolina over the Savannah River southwest of Allendale.  In Allendale, it has a short Concurrency with US 278. Additional concurrencies include US 321 in and around Ulmer, US 601  between Bamberg and Orangeburg, then US 15 and shortly afterwards Interstate 95 (I-95) in Santee, at exit 97 before all three move across Lake Marion. The US 15-301 concurrency leaves I-95 at exit 102, running in close proximity to I-95, but US 15 breaks away at Summerton, remaining on Church Street while US 301 turns right onto Main Street, which becomes Alvin Hardin Highway. Other concurrencies include US 521 from Manning to Alcolu, US 378 in Turbeville, US 52 between Effingham and just south of Florence,  US 76 eastbound from east of Florence until Pee Dee, and finally joins US 501 in Latta, where they both approach the South of the Border roadside attraction complex at the interchange with I-95 on the North–South Carolina border.

History

US 301 was established in 1932 as a replacement of the piece of US 17-1 north of Wilson and the whole of US 217. Thus US 301 initially ran from US 17 (now US 76) at Pee Dee northeast through Dillon, South Carolina, into North Carolina, and Virginia, ending at U.S. Route 1 in Petersburg, Virginia. This entire route is now paralleled by I-95.

In 1935, US 301 was extended southwest to US 15 at Summerton. This extension took it west on US 76 (formerly US 17) to Florence and south on US 52 (also formerly US 17) to Effingham. There it split to the southwest, running along what had been SC 4 via Manning to Summerton. This again travels parallel to I-95.

In the late 1940s, US 301 was extended again, south all the way towards Tampa, Florida. On the way there from South Carolina it ran along US 15 southwest to Santee, South Carolina and replaced SC 4 west to Orangeburg. From Orangeburg, US 301 ran southwest with U.S. Route 601 to Bamberg, replaced SC 33 to Ulmer, replaced SC 508 to Allendale, and replaced SC 73 to the Georgia state line.  When I-95 was built across Lake Marion in 1968, US 301 and 15 traveled parallel to it until they were relocated in a triple concurrency in 1987. In 2007, US 301 was rerouted on new  bypass routing southeast of Florence.

U.S. Route 217

U.S. Route 217 (US 217) was an original U.S. Highway, established in 1927. A renumbering of SC 23, it traversed from US 17, in Pee Dee, north through Latta and Dillon before entering North Carolina. In 1932, the entire route was renumbered as US 301.

Major intersections

See also

Special routes of U.S. Route 301

References

External links

US 301 at Virginia Highways' South Carolina Highways Annex
US 217 at Virginia Highways' South Carolina Highways Annex

01-3
 South Carolina
Transportation in Allendale County, South Carolina
Transportation in Bamberg County, South Carolina
Transportation in Orangeburg County, South Carolina
Transportation in Clarendon County, South Carolina
Transportation in Florence County, South Carolina
Transportation in Marion County, South Carolina
Transportation in Dillon County, South Carolina
1970 establishments in South Carolina
Florence, South Carolina metropolitan area